is a Japanese scientific drilling ship built for the Integrated Ocean Drilling Program (IODP). The vessel is designed to ultimately drill  beneath the seabed, where the Earth's crust is much thinner, and into the Earth's mantle, deeper than any other hole drilled in the ocean thus far.

While the planned depth of the hole is significantly less than the Russian Kola Superdeep Borehole (which reached  depth on land), the scientific results are expected to be much more interesting since the regions targeted by Chikyū include some of the most seismically-active regions of the world. Other deep holes have been drilled by the drill ship JOIDES Resolution during the Deep Sea Drilling Project and the Ocean Drilling Program.

Operation
The Japanese part of the IODP program is called , Japanese for "Earth Discovery". Chikyū is operated by the Centre for Deep Earth Research (CDEX), a subdivision of the Japan Agency for Marine-Earth Science and Technology (JAMSTEC). JAMSTEC also operates the DSV Shinkai, Earth Simulator supercomputer and other marine scientific research projects. CDEX is responsible for the services to support activities including on-board staffing, data management for core samples and logging; implements engineering site surveys; and conducts engineering developments. CDEX contracts with the Mantle Quest Japan Company for the navigation of the ship.

The Chikyū Hakken program is part of an international scientific collaborative effort with scientists from the United States, ECORD, a consortium consisting of several European countries and Canada, China, South Korea, Australia and New Zealand (ANZIC), and India.

Design
D/V Chikyū was built by the Mitsui Engineering & Shipbuilding and launched on 18 January 2002 in Nagasaki, Nagasaki. The ship was outfitted by the Mitsubishi Heavy Industries and delivered to JAMSTEC on 29 July 2005.

Its complement of 150 crew are divided between 100 operators and 50 science personnel, with at sea crew changes handled by helicopter transfer.

Key innovations include a GPS system and six adjustable computer controlled azimuth thrusters ( in diameter) that enable precise positioning to maintain a stable platform during deep water drilling.

The helipad can serve very large helicopters transporting as many as 30 persons per landing.

History

The D/V Chikyū was built for deep-sea geological scientific research, which now includes not only research of earthquake-generating zones in the Earth's crust but also hydrothermal vents and subsea methane hydrate research.

On 16 November 2007 Chikyū began drilling the  transect as planned, reaching  at the site of a future deep subsea floor observatory. The first stage of four NanTroSEIZE Stages was completed in February 2008. The whole project was envisioned to be completed by 2012.

The ship was damaged by the 2011 Tōhoku earthquake and tsunami on 11 March 2011. One of the six stabilizers was damaged and a  hole was made in the bottom. Local preliminary school children who were visiting the ship at the time of the earthquake spent one night on board and were rescued by Japan Self-Defense Forces helicopters next day. The ship was repaired at a dock in Shingū, Wakayama and returned to service in June 2011.

World record
On 6 September 2012 Scientific deep sea drilling vessel Chikyū set a new world record by drilling down and obtaining rock samples from deeper than 2,111 meters below the seafloor off the Shimokita Peninsula of Japan in the northwest Pacific Ocean.
That record still stands.

In popular culture

The D/V Chikyū is featured and plays a pivotal role in the 2006 film Sinking of Japan.

See also

 Scientific drilling program
 Project Mohole
 Kola Superdeep Borehole
 Ocean Drilling Program
 German Continental Deep Drilling Program
 San Andreas Fault Observatory at Depth
 Integrated Ocean Drilling Program
 Scientific drilling ships
 JOIDES Resolution
 Glomar Challenger
 Mohorovičić discontinuity
 Earthscope
 USARRAY

References

External links

 The Biggest Dig: Japan builds a ship to drill to the earth's mantle – Scientific American (September 2005)
 JAMSTEC's Chikyu Hakken 
 Official Page for Integrated Ocean Drilling Program
 CDEX Homepage, JAMSTEC.
 NanTroSEIZE homepage at CDEX, JAMSTEC.
 MANTLE QUEST JAPAN COMPANY
 IODP Riser Vessel homepage
 T-Limit Expedition

Science and technology in Japan
Structure of the Earth
2002 ships
Japan Agency for Marine-Earth Science and Technology
Drillships